The 2022 Maccabiah Games took place in Israel from July 14–25, 2022, and are also referred to as the 21st Maccabiah Games. The Maccabiah Games are open to Jewish athletes from around the world, and to all Israeli citizens regardless of their religion. Israeli former Olympic judo medalist Arik Zeevi served as Maccabiah Chairman. Approximately 10,000 athletes from 80 countries competed in 42 sports categories.

History 

The Maccabiah Games were named for ancient Jewish warrior Judah Maccabee from the village of Modi'in, who led the Maccabean Revolt against the Seleucid Empire from 167–160 BCE. They were first held in 1932. In 1961, the Games were recognized as Regional Games by the International Olympic Committee. The Games are overseen by Maccabi World Union.

Among other Olympic and world champions, swimmer Mark Spitz won 10 Maccabiah gold medals before earning his first of nine Olympic gold medals. The Games are the second-largest sports gathering in the world, by number of participants. At the 2017 Maccabiah Games, the nations that won the most medals were Israel, the United States, Australia, Canada, and Hungary.

Opening ceremonies 

The opening ceremonies took place on July 14, 2022, at Teddy Stadium in Jerusalem, Israel, which was also designated as the "Capital of the Maccabiah" for the Games. Israeli gymnasts and Olympic champions Linoy Ashram and Artem Dolgopyat lit the ceremonial torch at the opening ceremony. Torches were carried by Tokyo Olympic taekwondo medalist Avishag Semberg; swimmer Anastasia Gorbenko; paralympic swimmers Mark Malyar and Arab-Israeli Iyad Shalabi, and Jewish-American-Israeli Olympic and major league baseball player Ian Kinsler. Israeli pop singers Eden Ben Zaken and Static & Ben El Tavori performed.

United States President Joe Biden attended the opening ceremonies, cheering on the US delegation of 1,400 athletes—larger than the US delegation to the 2020 Summer Olympics. He said to them: "I’m so damn proud of you... Godspeed and go get ‘em, guys." He became the first American president to attend the Maccabiah Games.

Notable competitors 

Israeli Olympian and European Championships bronze medalist Lihie Raz swept the artistic gymnastics open women’s events, winning six gold medals. World champion bronze medalist Andrey Medvedev was part of the Team Israel squad that won the gold medal in the open men’s team.

In swimming, Israeli Olympian, two-time world champion, and national record holder Anastasia Gorbenko won the women’s 200 m individual medley, Israeli Olympian, former European Junior Champion, and national record holder Yakov Toumarkin won the men’s 200 m backstroke, and Israeli Olympian and national record holder Meiron Cheruti won the men's 50 m freestyle. Israeli Olympian and national record holder Gal Cohen Groumi won the men’s 100 m butterfly; he was at the time a rising sophomore at the University of Michigan and finished 10th in the 100 fly at the 2022 NCAA Division I Championships. Israeli Olympian Michael Laitarovsky won the men’s 100 m backstroke.  Israeli Bar Soloveychik won a gold medal while breaking the record that had stood for 33 years in the 400 m freestyle.

Olympic swimmer and national record holder Denis Petrashov of Kyrgyzstan won the men’s 100 m breaststroke.

In badminton, Israeli Olympian Ksenia Polikarpova won a gold medal in women's doubles and a silver medal in women's singles, Israeli Yuval Pugach won a gold medal in mixed doubles and a silver medal in women's doubles, and Israeli Alexander Bass won a silver medal in men's doubles. Lithuanian Alan Plavin won bronze medals in men's singles and men's doubles.

Participating countries 
The Maccabiah Games are open to Jewish athletes from around the world, and to all Israeli citizens regardless of their religion. The following countries (and number of athletes from each) are participating in the 2022 Maccabiah Games:

  (765; 3rd-largest delegation)
  (600+)
 
  (8)
 
 
  (700; 4th-largest delegation)
 
 
 
 
 
 
 
 
 
 
 
 
  (527)
 
 
 
 
 
 
  (1,884; largest delegation)
 
 
 
 
 
  (17)
 
 
 
 
 
 
 
 
 
 
 
 
 
 
 
 
 
 
  (45)
 
  (1,334; 2nd-largest delegation)
 
  (1)
  (2)
 Maccabi World Union
  Olim

Venues 
The Games took place at venues in a total of 18 Israeli cities. The following are the venues of the Maccabiah events, and the events held at them, throughout the country:

 Ashdod
 Ben Gurion Park – Cricket
 Caesarea
 Caesarea Golf Club – Golf
 Daliyat al-Karmel
 Darkha High School Sports Hall – Badminton
 Ganei Tikva
 Lider Sports Center – Fencing
 Gezer – Softball
 Hadera
 Enerbox Auditorium – Judo; Karate
 Haifa
 Ben Tzvi Hall – Futsal U16 and U18
 Ramat Alon Hall – Volleyball U16 and U18
 Romema Arena – Basketball U16 and U18
Jerusalem
 Arnona Community Center – Youth Ice Hockey; Women's Ice Hockey
 Givat Ram Stadium – Men's Football; Women's Football; Athletics
 Israel Tennis Center – Tennis
 YMCA Jerusalem – Weightlifting; Wheelchair Basketball
 Pais Arena – Men's Basketball; Women's Basketball; Men's Futsal; Women's Futsal
 Pisgat Ze'ev – Men's Volleyball; Women's Volleyball
 Netanya
 Yeshurun Hall – Basketball 45+
 Wingate Institute – Futsal 35+; Futsal 45+; Men's Rugby; Women's Rugby; Swimming; Water Polo
 Shapira – Football 35+; Football 45+; Football 55+
 Sharon Auditorium – Basketball 35+
 Rigler Auditorium – Volleyball
 Petach Tikva
 Rozmarin Hall – Netball
 Nof HaGalil
 Green Stadium – Men's Football U18 and U16; Women's Football U16 and U18
 Ramat Gan
Maccabiah Village – Padel
 Ramat HaSharon
 Tennis Center – Tennis 65+
 Ra'anana
 Aviv Hall – Netball 16+; Netball 18+; Netball 35+
 Moadon – Bowls
 Metro West – Table Tennis
 Squash Center – Squash
 Ra'anana Park – Baseball
 Sharona
 Horse Park – Dressage; Jumping
 Tel Aviv
 Hadar Yosef National Sport Center – Artistic Gymnastics; Rhythmic Gymnastics
 Velodrome Tel Aviv – Cycling

Medal count

Sports 
Athletes at the Games are competing in 29 different sports, encompassing a total of 42 disciplines. Five new sports were added for the 2022 Maccabiah:  3×3 basketball, bouldering, surfing, motocross, and padel, and three new sports for women: ice hockey, football, and futsal. Pickleball was accepted as an exhibition sport at the Games.

Aquatics
Swimming
Swimming (open water)
Water Polo
Athletics
Half marathon
Track and field
Badminton
Baseball
Basketball
Basketball
Basketball 3x3 (new)
Wheelchair basketball
Bowling
Lawn Bowling
 Bouldering (new)
Chess
Cricket
Cycling
Equestrian
Fencing
Field Hockey
Football
Football
Futsal
Beach Football (new)
Golf
Gymnastics
Artistic
Rhythmic
Ice Hockey
Judo
Karate
Netball
Rugby
 Padel (new)
Rugby 7s
Rugby 15s
Softball
Squash
 Surfing (new)
Table Tennis
Tennis
Tennis
Volleyball
Volleyball
Beach Volleyball
 Weightlifting (reintroduced)

Closing ceremony 
The closing ceremony took place on July 25, 2022, in Live Park in Rishon LeTzion. Singer Noa Kirel performed.

See also 
Sport in Israel

References

External links 
 Official website
 Maccabiah Village 2022
 Maccabi RSA
Jacob Gurvis (July 22, 2022).  “How the Maccabiah Games supported a Jewish family in the face of tragedy,” The Jerusalem Post

 
Maccabiah Games
Maccabiah Games
Maccabiah Games
2022 in Jerusalem
Maccabiah Games